Dracula is an 1897 novel by Bram Stoker.

Dracula may also refer to:
Count Dracula, the title character in the novel
Vlad the Impaler (1431–1476), or Vlad Dracula, ruler of Wallachia

Arts and entertainment

Film and television

Film
 Dracula (Universal film series)
 Dracula (1931 English-language film)
 Dracula (1931 Spanish-language film)
 Dracula (Hammer film series)
 Dracula (1958 film), starring Christopher Lee
 Dracula: Prince of Darkness a 1966 film, starring Christopher Lee
 Count Dracula (1970 film), starring Christopher Lee
 Bram Stoker's Dracula (1974 film), a TV adaptation
 Count Dracula (1977 film), a BBC TV production
 Dracula (1979 film), starring Frank Langella
 Bram Stoker's Dracula (1992 film), starring Gary Oldman
 Dracula: Dead and Loving It, 1995
 Dracula 2000, 2000
 Dark Prince: The True Story of Dracula, or Dracula: The Dark Prince, 2000
 Dracula: Pages from a Virgin's Diary, 2002
 Dracula (2006 film), a TV adaptation
 Dracula 3D, 2012
 Dracula: The Dark Prince, or Dark Prince: The True Story of Dracula, 2013

Television
 Dracula (Mystery and Imagination), a 1968 television play adaptation
 Dracula: The Series, a 1990 Canadian syndicated series
 Dracula (miniseries), a 2002 Italian series
 Dracula (2013 TV series), by Cole Haddon and Daniel Knauff
 Dracula (2020 TV series), by Mark Gatiss and Steven Moffat
 Dracula (2021 TV series), an Iranian home video by Mehran Modiri

Gaming
 Dracula (pinball), a 1979 pinball machine
 Dracula (1986 video game)
 Dracula Hakushaku, a 1992 video game
 Bram Stoker's Dracula (pinball), a 1993 pinball machine
 Bram Stoker's Dracula (video game), a 1993 video game
 Bram Stoker's Dracula (handheld video game), a 1993 handheld video game
 Dracula: Resurrection, a 1999 video game
 Dracula: Crazy Vampire, a 2001 video game
 Dracula: Origin, a 2008 PC game
 Dracula (Castlevania), a character in Castlevania video games

Music
 Dracula (album), a 1999 soundtrack performed by Kronos Quartet, with music by Philip Glass, for the 1931 film
 Dracula, a 1979 soundtrack by John Williams
 "Dracula", a song by Gorillaz from the US version of the 2001 album Gorillaz
 "Dracula", a song by Iced Earth from the 2001 album Horror Show
 "Dracula", a song by Sharon Needles from the 2015 album Taxidermy
 "Dracula", a 2011 song by Basement Jaxx
 "Dracula", a 2014 song by Bea Miller from the 2015 album Not an Apology
 "Dracula"/"The Rose", a 1989 single by Claw Boys Claw

Plays and musicals
 Dracula (1924 play), by Hamilton Deane, revived in 1977
 Dracula (1995 play), by John Godber and Jane Thornton
 Dracula (1996 play), by Steven Dietz 
 Dracula (Czech musical), 1995
 Dracula: A Chamber Musical, 1997, by Richard Ouzounian and Marek Norman
 Dracula, the Musical, 2001, by Frank Wildhorn, Don Black and Christopher Hampton
 Dracula – Entre l'amour et la mort, 2006 
 Dracula – L'amour plus fort que la mort, 2011

Other uses in arts and entertainment
 Dracula (comics), several characters in comics
 Dracula (radio drama), an 1938 episode of The Mercury Theatre on the Air
 Grandpa (The Munsters), or Sam Dracula, a fictional character 
 Lily Munster, born Lily Dracula

Other uses
 Dracula (plant), a genus of orchids 
 Dracula (CAD software), by EDA 
 Dracula (color scheme)

See also

 Alucard (disambiguation) ("Dracula" spelled backwards)
 Dacula, Georgia, a suburb of Atlanta
 Dr. Acula (disambiguation)
 Dracu River (disambiguation)
 Dracul (disambiguation)
 Count Dracula in popular culture
 Vlad II Dracul (died 1447), Prince of Wallachia and Governor of Transylvania
 Ottomar Rodolphe Vlad Dracula Prince Kretzulesco (1940–2007), German socialite